is a former Japanese football player and current assistant manager of Indian Super League club Mumbai City FC.

Playing career
Miyazawa was born in Hokkaido on November 22, 1970. After graduating from Chuo University, he joined JEF United Ichihara in 1993. He played as center back from first season. However his opportunity to play decreased from 1994 and he moved to Bellmare Hiratsuka in 1996. Although he played as regular player in 1996, he could hardly play in the match in 1997. In 1998, he moved to Sanfrecce Hiroshima. Although he played many matches in 1998, he could not play at all in the match for injury from 1999. In October 2000, he moved to Australian club Canberra Cosmos. However the club was disbanded 2001. He moved to New Zealand club Football Kingz, where he retired in 2003.

Club statistics

References

External links

biglobe.ne.jp

1970 births
Living people
Chuo University alumni
Association football people from Hokkaido
Japanese footballers
Japanese expatriate footballers
J1 League players
JEF United Chiba players
Shonan Bellmare players
Sanfrecce Hiroshima players
Association football defenders